Fosshaugane Campus is the current home ground for the football team, Sogndal Fotball. It is also a combined with a school's campus, from where it got its name.

The stadium was inaugurated on 7 July 2006 when Sogndal beat Bryne 2–0. In a 2012 survey carried out by the Norwegian Players' Association among away-team captains, Fosshaugane was ranked lowest amongst league stadiums, with a score of 1.93 on a scale from one to five.

Facts
Capacity: 5,622
Record attendance: 7,000 (Sogndal – Start, 5 September 1976)
Opening game: 7 July 2006 (Sogndal – Bryne)

References

External links
Club information at SogndalFotball.no
Construction project at Veidekke.no
Presentation by Sogndal Fotball

Sogndal
Sogndal Fotball
Football venues in Norway
Eliteserien venues
Sports venues in Vestland
Sports venues completed in 2006
2006 establishments in Norway